Populus deltoides, the eastern cottonwood or necklace poplar, is a cottonwood poplar native to North America, growing throughout the eastern, central, and southwestern United States as well as the southern Canadian prairies, the southernmost part of eastern Canada, and northeastern Mexico.

Description 
The bark is silvery-white, smooth or lightly fissured when young, becoming dark gray and deeply fissured on old trees. 

The twigs are grayish-yellow and stout, with large triangular leaf scars. It is one of the fastest growing trees in North America. Sustained height growth of  height growth and  diameter growth per year for 25 years is common.

The leaf is very coarsely toothed, the teeth are curved and gland tipped, and the petiole is flat; they are dark green in the summer and turn yellow in the fall (but many cottonwoods in dry locations drop their leaves early from the combination of drought and leaf rust, making their fall color dull or absent). Due to the flat stem of the leaf, the leaf has the tendency to shake from even the slightest breeze. This is one of the identifying characteristics.

It is dioecious, with the flowers (catkins) produced on single-sex trees in early spring. A single tree may release 40 million seeds a season.

Variation 
The species is divided into three subspecies or up to five varieties. The subspecies classification is as follows:
Populus deltoides subsp. deltoides,  eastern cottonwood is found in southeastern Canada (the south of Ontario and Quebec) and the eastern United States (throughout, west to North Dakota to Texas).
P. d. monilifera (Aiton) Eckenw., the plains cottonwood (syn. P. deltoides var. occidentalis Rydb.; P. sargentii Dode) ranges from southcentral Canada (southern Alberta, Saskatchewan, and Manitoba) to the central United States and south to northern New Mexico and Texas. It is the state tree of Wyoming.
P. d. wislizeni (S.Watson) Eckenw., the Rio Grande cottonwood (syn. P. wislizeni (S.Watson) Sarg.; P. fremontii var. wislizeni S.Watson) grows from southern Colorado south through Texas to northeastern Mexico (Chihuahua, San Luis Potosi), and west to Arizona (presence in California, listed by GRIN, is doubtful, not included in the Jepson Flora of California). (Note: Some sources mistakenly spell the epithet "wislizenii". Correct spelling is with one "i", per ICN article 60C.2.)

Ecology 
It needs bare soil and full sun for successful germination and establishment; in natural conditions, it usually grows near rivers, with mud banks left after floods providing ideal conditions for seedling germination; human soil cultivation has allowed it to increase its range away from such habitats.

Unlike related species such as quaking aspen, it does not propagate through clonal colonies, but will resprout readily when cut down.

The leaves serve as food for caterpillars of various Lepidoptera.

Uses 
The wood of eastern cottonwood is typical of the Populus family in its softness, weighing just . It is utilized for things like plywood and interior parts of furniture.

General Custer fed his horses and mules the bark during the 1868–69 winter campaign against Native American tribes south of Arkansas. According to Charles Goodnight, cowboys afflicted with gastric disorders would make an astringent tea from the inner bark.

Oldest and largest 

Eastern cottonwoods typically live 70–100 years, but they have the potential to live 200–400 years in ideal conditions.

The Balmville Tree (felled in 2015 at approximately 316 years old) was the oldest eastern cottonwood in the United States.

This cottonwood was planted in the 1870s.

Symbolism 
Calling the cottonwood tree "the pioneer of the prairie", the Kansas state legislature designated the cottonwood the official state tree of Kansas in 1937. It became the state tree of Wyoming in 1947, and that of Nebraska since 1972.

See also 
Populus section Aigeiros

References

External links 
 
 Video footage of Eastern Cottonwood

deltoides
Symbols of Kansas
Symbols of Nebraska
Symbols of Wyoming
Trees of Alberta
Trees of humid continental climate
Trees of Mexico
Trees of Ontario
Trees of Saskatchewan
Trees of Eastern Canada
Trees of the Eastern United States
Trees of the Great Lakes region (North America)
Trees of the North-Central United States
Trees of the Northeastern United States
Trees of the Northwestern United States
Trees of the Plains-Midwest (United States)
Trees of the South-Central United States
Trees of the Southeastern United States
Trees of the Southwestern United States
Trees of the United States